West Lothian was a Scottish county constituency of the House of Commons of the Parliament of the United Kingdom from 1950 to 1983. Its area corresponds to the Council area of West Lothian. It elected one Member of Parliament (MP) by the first past the post voting system.

The constituency is best known for its third and final MP, Tam Dalyell of the Labour Party, whose concerns about Scottish devolution were labelled "the West Lothian question".

History 
West Lothian was created for the 1950 general election, partly replacing the previous Linlithgowshire constituency.

With effect from the 1983 general election, it became two different constituencies: Linlithgow and Livingston.

Members of Parliament

Election results

Elections in the 1950s

Elections in the 1960s

Elections in the 1970s

See also
 West Lothian question

References 

Politics of West Lothian
Historic parliamentary constituencies in Scotland (Westminster)
Constituencies of the Parliament of the United Kingdom established in 1950
Constituencies of the Parliament of the United Kingdom disestablished in 1983